Set on Fire may refer to:

 The ability to make fire. See Fire#Human control
 "Set on Fire" (song), 2016 song by American alternative band Magic Giant

See also
"Set Me on Fire", debut single of Bella Ferraro, contestant on the fourth season of The X Factor Australia.
Set the Fire, album by Canadian alternative rock band 54-40,
Set Yourself on Fire, album by Canadian indie rock band Stars
Set the World on Fire (disambiguation), many articles